Novokiyevka is a rural locality (a khutor) and the administrative center of Novokiyevskoye Rural Settlement, Novoanninsky District, Volgograd Oblast, Russia. The population was 762 as of 2010. There are 15 streets.

Geography 
Novokiyevka is located on the Khopyorsko-Buzulukskaya Plain, 50 km southeast of Novoanninsky (the district's administrative centre) by road. Talovsky is the nearest rural locality.

References 

Rural localities in Novoanninsky District